Hattenhofen may refer to the following places in Germany:

Hattenhofen, Baden-Württemberg, in the district of Göppingen
Hattenhofen, Bavaria, in the district of Fürstenfeldbruck